Leonizius can refer to:

A fictional planet in Battlestar Galactica, one of the Twelve Colonies
Stars of the constellation Leo
 Leonis (plant) , a plant genus in Asteraceae family